is a Japanese pop singer and fashion model. She is currently a member of Canary Club CAN'S division with Mana Ogawa. She is known to have very flexible ears as they were featured in Star King on October 15, 2011.

Television Appearances

  (March 2009, TBS)
  (June 2009, TBS)
  (July 2011, TBS)
 Star King (October 15, 2011, SBS in South Korea)

References

External links
  Nice Girl Project Profile
  Canary Club Official Blog
  Ayumi Takada's Blog

1984 births
Models from Chiba Prefecture
Living people
Japanese female models
Japanese idols
Musicians from Chiba Prefecture
Nice Girl Project!